Hammatoceras is a genus of ammonites belonging to the family Hammatoceratidae which lived during the Toarcian stage of the Early/Lower Jurassic between about 184 and 175 million year ago.

Taxonomy
Hammatoceras is included in the subfamily Hammatoceratinae, which in the outdated 1957 Treatise on Invertebrate Paleontology was part of the Hammatoceratidae, but of the Phymatoceratidae in D.T. Donovan et al., 1981, a case of what to base the family name on.  Both accordingly contain the earlier  Phytmatoceratinae and derived Hammatoceratinae. The superfamily Hammatoceratoidea in which the Hammatocaratidae and related families are currently placed is abandoned in favor of the older, equivalent, Hildoceratoidea. (M. K. Howarth. 2013)

Species
Species within this genus include:

?Hammatoceras gabillyi Martinez, 1992
Hammatoceras insigne Schubler, 1831
?Hammatoceras costatum (Gabilly, 1973)
Hammatoceras pachu Buckman, 1921
Hammatoceras clausum Gabilly, 1973 
Hammatoceras semilunatum Quenstedt, 1885
Hammatoceras roubanense Elmi, 1998
Hammatoceras bonarellii Parisch & Viale, 1906
Hammatoceras subplanatum De Brun, 1932
Hammatoceras speciosum Janensch, 1902

Fossil record
This genus is known in the fossil record in the Middle Jurassic, from 175.6 million years ago to about 171.6 million years ago. Fossil shells within this genus have been found in Canada, France, Germany, Hungary, Indonesia, Italy, Spain, Tunisia and the United Kingdom.

Description
The shell of Hammatoceras varies from evolute to sub-involute, according to species and growth stage. All are compressed, i.e. discoidal, in form, with strong ribbing and a keeled ventor. Ribs arise from tubercles on the umbilical shoulder, the inner, dorso-lateral margin of the whorls, and bifurcate on the flanks, stopping at the ventral keel. Juvenile forms tend to be more evolute with more of the inner whorls showing, whereas mature forms tend to be more involute with outer whorls more strongly embracing.

References

 W.J, Arkellet al., 1957. Mosozoic Ammonoidea. Treatise on Invertebrate  Paleontology, Part L. Geological Society of America and University of Kansas Press.
 D.T.Donovan, J.H. Callomon, & M.K. Howarth, 1981. Classification of the Jurassic Ammonitina. The Ammonoidea, Systematics Association Special Volume no 18. 
 Classification of Howarth 2013  from M. K. Howarth. 2013. 
 Treatise on Invertebrate Paleontology, Part L, Revised, Volume 3B, Chapter 4: Psiloceratoidea, Eoderoceratoidea, Hildoceratoidea.

Early Jurassic ammonites of Europe
Ammonitida genera
Jurassic ammonites
Toarcian life
Hammatoceratidae